The Portugal national youth football teams are the national under-23, under-21, under-20, under-19, under-18, under-17, under-16 and under-15 football teams of Portugal and are controlled by the Portuguese Football Federation. The youth teams of Portugal participate in tournaments sanctioned by both FIFA and UEFA and also participates in world, regional, and local international tournaments.

Portugal national under-23 squad

Portugal national under-21 squad 

The following 23 players have been called up for the 2019 UEFA European Under-21 Championship qualification matches against Poland.

Caps and goals are correct as of 20 November 2018 after the game against Poland.

|-----
! colspan="9" bgcolor="#900020" align="left" |
|----- bgcolor="900020"

|-----
! colspan="9" bgcolor="#900020" align="left" |
|----- bgcolor="900020"

|-----
! colspan="9" bgcolor="#900020" align="left" |
|----- bgcolor="#900020"

Portugal national under-20 squad 

The provisional squad for the 2019 FIFA U-20 World Cup was announced on 10 May 2019.

Portugal national under-19 squad 

The following players have been called up to participate in the 2018 UEFA European Under-19 Championship.

Portugal national under-18 squad

Portugal national under-17 squad 

The following players were selected for:

Competition: 2019 UEFA European Under-17 Championship qualification
Match Dates: 20, 23, 26 March 2019

Portugal national under-16 squad

Portugal national under-15 squad

Honours
Under-20 football team
FIFA U-20 World Cup: 1989, 1991
Under-19 football team
UEFA European Under-19 Championship: 2018
Under-18 football team
UEFA European Under-18 Championship: 1961, 1994, 1999 
Under-17 football team
UEFA European Under-17 Championship: 2003, 2016
Under-16 football team
UEFA European Under-16 Championship: 1989, 1995, 1996, 2000
Under-15 football team
CONCACAF Under-15 Championship: 2019
Nations Cup: 2019

References

External links
 Official U-21 site
 Official U-20 site
 Official U-19 site
 Official U-18 site
 Official U-17 site
 Official U-16 site
 Official U-15 site

Youth football in Portugal
F